Abou Redis is a city in South Sinai Governorate, Egypt. Its area is 2400 square km. It contains many Christian churches in Wadi Feran area.

See also
Abu Zenima

External links

South Sinai Governorate  Official website

References 

Populated places in South Sinai Governorate